Rotem Commuter Cars are a series of multi-level passenger rail cars for commuter rail operations manufactured by Hyundai Rotem.

Hyundai Rotem began marketing commuter rail cars in 2006 to compete with rail car manufacturers in North America against established manufacturers like Bombardier Transportation and Kawasaki Heavy Industries Rolling Stock Company.

Types
BTC-5 (Blind Trailer Coach) - car coaches with 179 seats and capacity for 185
CTC-5 (Control Trailer Coach) - car coaches with 173 seats and capacity for 179
Bi-level rail set - rail set consisting of locomotive, coaches and cab car seating 233 passengers and capacity for 337

Operators
MBTA Commuter Rail - both BTC and CTC cars
Metrolink - Bi-level Coach and Cab cars
Tri-Rail - Bi-level Coach and Cab Cars (24 Total)

Plants
Philadelphia - assembly opened in 2008 to meet made in America requirements, closed 2018.

Gallery

References

External links
Hyundai Rotem - Official Website

MBTA Commuter Rail
Metrolink (California)
Rail passenger cars of the United States
Tri-Rail